The Institut polytechnique de Lyon (IPL) is a research university system located in Lyon, France. It consists of four engineering schools : CPE Lyon, ECAM LaSalle, ISARA Lyon and ITECH Lyon.

It has been created the 13th of January 1992 to initially respond to a request from the Rhône-Alpes region, to pool resources.

Today, the objectives of the IPL are to achieve synergy between member schools, to promote certain concerted actions and being the interlocutor of the administrative and regional authorities.

Its missions are therefore:

 development of the human and general training of the engineer.
 development of international relations.
 development of relations with institutional partners in Rhône-Alpes, in particular the University of Lyon, of which it is an associate member.

See also

References

External links 
 

Lyon
Universities and colleges in Lyon